The 1979 Oregon Ducks football team represented the University of Oregon during the 1979 NCAA Division I-A football season. Playing as a member of the Pacific-10 Conference (Pac-10), the team was led by head coach Rich Brooks, in his third year, and played their home games at Autzen Stadium in Eugene, Oregon. They finished the season with a record of six wins and five losses  overall,  in 

It was Oregon's first winning season since 1970.

Cal claims a loss to Oregon as a victory, as "Oregon forfeited due to ineligible player."

Schedule

Roster

Not listed: Bryan Hinkle, Scott Setterlund

Game summaries

Oregon State

References

Oregon
Oregon Ducks football seasons
Oregon Ducks football